The 1960 UCI Track Cycling World Championships were the World Championship for track cycling. They took place in Leipzig and Chemnitz, East Germany from 3 to 14 August 1960. Eight events were contested, 6 for men (3 for professionals, 3 for amateurs) and 2 for women.

Medal summary

Medal table

See also
 1960 UCI Road World Championships

References

Track cycling
UCI Track Cycling World Championships by year
International sports competitions hosted by East Germany
Sports competitions in Leipzig
1960 in track cycling
1960 in German sport
International cycle races hosted by Germany